It's Real is the second studio album by American R&B duo and brothers K-Ci & JoJo, released on June 22, 1999 on MCA Records. Recording sessions took place from 1998–1999. The album peaked within the top 10 on the US Billboard 200 as well as Billboard'''s Top R&B/Hip-Hop Albums. On July 26, 1999, the album was certified platinum by the Recording Industry Association of America (RIAA) for shipments of 1,000,000 copies in the United States. It also appeared on international charts, and was certified gold by Music Canada. Upon release, It's Real received average reviews. The album would spawn four singles including the number-two hit single "Tell Me It's Real".

 Content 
The tenth track, "Girl", the duo is expressing sorrow to a woman who is not dedicated to holding on to their hearts, with the duo singing, "Girl, if you really do love me, just let me go, let me be so I can find someone to love me."

 Release and promotion It's Real was released on MCA Records on June 22, 1999 and was available on a CD, cassette, and an LP. Two bonus versions were released: one featuring "All My Life" and a Japanese edition featuring "All My Life" and "Impossible".

 Singles 
Four songs on Its Real became singles. "Life", released in 1999, was the first. It peaked at number 60 on the US Billboard Hot 100 and number 15 on Hot R&B/Hip-Hop Songs. The following single, "Tell Me It's Real", was the most successful from the album. It peaked at number two on the Hot 100 and Hot R&B/Hip-Hop Songs. As the only single to chart internationally, the song peaked at number four on the New Zealand Singles Chart, number 13 on the Dutch Singles Chart, and number 16 on the UK Singles Chart. The third single released was "Fee Fie Foe Fum" (1999). It did not crack the Hot 100; however, it peaked at number one on the Bubbling Under Hot 100 Singles, a chart that acts as a 25-song extension to the Hot 100. The final single released was "Girl" on January 30, 2000. It peaked at number 30 on the US Rhythmic Top 40.

 Reception 
 Commercial performance It's Real debuted at number 8 on the US Billboard 200, which would be its peak. It also peaked at number 2 on Top R&B/Hip-Hop Albums. On July 26, 1999, the album was certified platinum by the RIAA, for shipments of 1,000,000 copies. The album charted internationally, as well. It peaked at number 26 in Canada, and on August 23, 1999 it was certified gold by Music Canada, for shipments of 50,000 copies. It also peaked at number 14 in Australia and the Netherlands, number 34 in New Zealand, and number 56 in the United Kingdom.

 Critical response 

Upon its release, It's Real received average reviews from music critics. Stephen Thomas Erlewine, senior writer at Allmusic, gave the album three out of five stars, saying "it simply replicates [Love Always]". She gives "Makin' Me Say Goodbye", "I Wanna Get to Know You", "How Long Must I Cry", and "Hello Darlin very high praise and says the CD is worth just for those songs.

Track listing

 Personnel 
Credits for It's Real'' adapted from Allmusic.

Michael Benabib – Photography
Rory Bennett 	– Multi Instruments, Producer
Babyface 
Chuck Berghofer – Strings
Julie Berghofer – Strings
Charlie Bisharat – Strings
Jay Boberg – Executive Producer
Rev. Dave Boruff – Strings
Jacqueline Brand – Strings
Craig Brockman – Keyboards, Producer
Rebecca Bunnell – Strings
Darius Campo – Strings
Rob Chiarelli – Mixing
Larry Corbett – Strings
Franklyn D'Antonio – Strings
Chuck Domanico – Strings
Joey "The Don" Donatello – Editing, Engineer, Programming
Bruce Dukov – Strings
Charles Everett – Strings
Drew FitzGerald – Art Direction
Ronald Folsom – Strings
Juliann French – Strings
Armen Garabedian – Strings
Jeff Griffin – Assistant Engineer, Mixing
Cedric "K-Ci" Hailey – Executive Producer, Vocal Arrangement, Vocals, Vocals (Background)
Joel "JoJo" Hailey – Drum Programming, Executive Producer, Guitar, Guitar (Acoustic), Guitar (Bass), Producer, Vocal Arrangement, Vocals, Vocals (Background)
Paul Hanson – Strings
Terry Harrington – Strings
Al Hershberger – Strings
Carrie Holzman-Little – Strings
Paul Jackson, Jr. – Guitar
Damon Jones – Executive Producer
Karen Jones – Strings
R. Kelly – Arranger, Producer
Peter Kent – Strings
Anthony Kilhoffer – Engineer, Programming
Armen Ksadjikian – Strings
Derek Lee – Stylist

Jonathan LeSane – Engineer
David Low – Strings
Tony Maserati – Mixing
Ian Mereness – Assistant Engineer
Liza Montoya – Stylist
Greg Mull – Engineer
Brian O'Connor – Strings
Bobby O'Donnell – Strings
Emanuel Officer – Producer
Simon Oswell – Strings
Sid Page – Strings
Darryl Pearson – Multi Instruments, Producer
Dave Pensado – Mixing
Barbara Porter – Strings
Herb Powers – Mastering
Public Domain – Composer
Jeff Redd – Executive Producer
Kendra Richards – Hair Stylist, Make-Up
Steve Richards – Strings
Bryon Rickerson – Assistant Engineer
Anatoly Rosinsky – Strings
John Scanlon – Strings
Mike Smoov – Guitar, Guitar (Acoustic), Guitar (Bass), Producer
David Speltz – Strings
Ralph Stacy – Producer
Jim Thatcher – Strings
Richard Treat – Strings
Jeff Vereb – Engineer, Programming
Randy Waldman – Conductor, String Arrangements
Kevin Westenberg – Photography
Ken Wild – Strings
Evan Wilson – Strings
Stan Wood – Assistant Engineer, Editing, Engineer, Programming
Jeffrey "Woody" Woodruff – Engineer
Ken Yerke – Strings
Alex York – Assistant Engineer
 Mihail Zinovyev – Strings

Charts and certifications

Weekly charts

Year-end charts

Certifications

References

External links 
 

1999 albums
K-Ci & JoJo albums